Strzelce may refer to the following places in Poland:
Strzelce Opolskie, a town in Opole Voivodeship, south-west Poland, seat of Strzelce County
Strzelce Krajeńskie, a town in Lubusz Voivodeship, west Poland, seat of Strzelce-Drezdenko County
Strzelce, Greater Poland Voivodeship (west-central Poland)
Strzelce, Kuyavian-Pomeranian Voivodeship (north-central Poland)
Strzelce, Kutno County in Łódź Voivodeship (central Poland)
Strzelce, Opoczno County in Łódź Voivodeship (central Poland)
Strzelce, Oleśnica County in Lower Silesian Voivodeship (south-west Poland)
Strzelce, Świdnica County in Lower Silesian Voivodeship (south-west Poland)
Strzelce, Chełm County in Lublin Voivodeship (east Poland)
Strzelce Landscape Park, a protected area in Lublin Voivodeship
Strzelce, Puławy County in Lublin Voivodeship (east Poland)
Strzelce, Opole Voivodeship (south-west Poland)
Strzelce, Świętokrzyskie Voivodeship (south-central Poland)
Strzelce, Warmian-Masurian Voivodeship (north Poland)